Licha is a monotypic moth genus of the family Noctuidae. Its only species, Licha undilinealis, is found in Venezuela and the Brazilian state of Rio de Janeiro. Both the genus and species were first described by Francis Walker in 1859.

References

Acronictinae
Monotypic moth genera